Postan Sar (also Romanized as Postān Sar) is a village in Tula Rud Rural District, in the Central District of Talesh County, Gilan Province, Iran. At the 2006 census, its population was 64, in 12 families.

References 

Populated places in Talesh County